Nikitinsky is a rural locality (a khutor) in Kumylzhenskoye Rural Settlement, Kumylzhensky District, Volgograd Oblast, Russia. The population was 399 as of 2010. There are 4 streets.

Geography 
Nikitinsky is located in forest steppe, on Khopyorsko-Buzulukskaya Plain, on the bank of the Sukhodol River, 21 km northeast of Kumylzhenskaya (the district's administrative centre) by road. Zhukovsky is the nearest rural locality.

References 

Rural localities in Kumylzhensky District